European route E74 is a series of roads in France and Italy, part of the United Nations International E-road network. The route runs from Nice in France to Alessandria in Italy.

At its starting point in Nice the E74 connects to European route E80, from where it heads southeast, crossing the Italian border into Piedmont, then passing through Cuneo and Asti before finally reaching Alessandria. At this point it links to European route E25 and European route E70.

References

External links 
 UN Economic Commission for Europe: Overall Map of E-road Network (2007)

74
E074
E074